Trichocentrum lanceanum is a species of orchid found from Trinidad to southern tropical America.

References

External links 

lanceanum
Orchids of Trinidad